Kalamullah Al-Hafiz bin Mat Rowi (born 30 July 1995) is a Malaysian professional footballer who plays as a goalkeeper for Malaysia Super League club Kedah Darul Aman and the Malaysia national team.

Club career

Petaling Jaya City
After his contract with Felda United expired, Kalam joined Petaling Jaya City in 2019. He started as third-choice goalkeeper and made his debut for the club in a 0–3 loss to Selangor on 13 July 2019.

Kedah Darul Aman
On 7 December 2022, Kalam signed a two-year contract with Kedah Darul Aman.

International career
Kalam received his first call up for the Malaysian national team on 23 September 2021.

Career statistics

Club

International

Honours
Felda United
 Malaysia Premier League: 2018

Malaysia
 King's Cup runner-up: 2022

References

External links
 

1995 births
Living people
People from Kelantan
Malaysian footballers
Malaysia Premier League players
Malaysia Super League players
Felda United F.C. players
Petaling Jaya City FC players
Kedah Darul Aman F.C. players
Association football goalkeepers
Malaysian people of Yemeni descent